Mufindi District is one of the four districts of the Iringa Region of Tanzania.  It is bordered to the north by Kilolo District and Iringa Urban District, to the south by the Njombe Region, to the east by the Morogoro Region and to the west by the Singida Region.

, the population of the Mufindi District was 283,032.

Geography
Mufindi is mountainous, with one of the coolest and rainiest climates in Tanzania. Among many, the district is known for its tea and timber industries.

Administrative subdivisions

Constituencies
For parliamentary elections, Tanzania is divided into constituencies. As of the 2015 general elections, Mufindi District had three constituencies: Mufindi North constituency, Mufindi South constituency, and Mafinga constituency.
 Mufindi Constituency

Divisions
Mufindi district is divided into 5 divisions, these are Ifwagi, Sadani, Kibengu, Mapanda, and Malangali

Wards
, Mufindi District was administratively divided into twenty-eight wards:

 Bumilayinga
 Ifunda
 Ifwagi
 Igombavanu
 Igowole
 Ihalimba
 Ihanu
 Ihowanza
 Ikweha
 Isalavanu
 Itandula
 Kasanga
 Kibengu
 Kiyowela
 Luhunga
 Mafinga
 Makungu
 Malangali
 Mapanda
 Mbalamaziwa
 Mdabulo
 Mninga
 Mpanga TAZARA
 Mtambula
 Mtwango
 Nyololo
 Rungemba
 Sadani

Image gallery

Notes

Districts of Iringa Region

es:Mufindi
vi:Mufindi (huyện)